Robert J. Gallery (born July 26, 1980) is a former American football offensive guard who played for eight seasons in the National Football League (NFL). He played college football for the University of Iowa, and received unanimous All-American recognition. He was selected by the Oakland Raiders second overall in the 2004 NFL Draft. He also played for the Seattle Seahawks.

Early years
Gallery was born in Manchester, Iowa.  He attended East Buchanan High School in Winthrop, Iowa, and starred in football, basketball, and track.  In football, he played tight end and linebacker, and also handled punting and kickoff duties. He was an all-conference honorable mention selection as a sophomore before being named first-team all-conference as a junior and senior. Gallery helped his high school team to a three-year record of 24-8, including a 19-2 record in district play. He was a Des Moines Register Class 1A first-team all-state selection as a senior. In addition to his athletic accomplishments, Gallery earned the rank of Eagle Scout.

College career
Gallery went to the University of Iowa, and played for the Iowa Hawkeyes football team from 1999 to 2003. His older brother, Nick, had been an All-Big Ten punter for the Hawkeyes, and his younger brother, John, later became a punter for the Hawkeyes. After red-shirting in 1999, Gallery had three catches for 52 yards as a starting tight end as a freshman before moving to the tackle position. He started six games at the right tackle position as a freshman.

As a sophomore, Gallery started every game at left tackle and made vast improvements throughout the year. He helped Iowa lead the Big Ten Conference in scoring in 2001 as Iowa qualified for their first bowl game in four years. As a junior in 2002, Gallery started all 13 games at left tackle and was a first-team All-Big Ten selection. He helped lead Iowa to their first Big Ten title in 12 years and their first undefeated conference season in eighty years. He also won the team's Hustle Award.

In 2003, Gallery led Iowa to another ten-win season and was voted as Iowa's co-captain and co-MVP for the season. He was a first-team All-Big Ten selection for the second straight year and named the Big Ten Conference Offensive Lineman of the Year. He was recognized as a unanimous first-team All-American as a senior in 2003. He was awarded the 2003 Outland Trophy, making him the third lineman from Iowa to win the award (Alex Karras and Cal Jones being the other two). He was also a three-time academic All-Big Ten selection at Iowa.

Gallery graduated with a bachelor's degree in education from the University of Iowa. As part of his pre-professional training, he taught at two local elementary schools.

On January 9, 2023 The College Football Hall of Fame voted to select Gallery for induction into the 2023 Class.

Professional career

2004 NFL Draft
Gallery was selected with the second overall pick in the 2004 NFL Draft by the Oakland Raiders. He was regarded as "the best lineman to come out of college in years", with a perfect 9.0 Draft Prospect Rating, the highest for any offensive lineman.

Oakland Raiders
In 2004, Gallery started 15 games at right tackle and gave up three sacks. In 2005, he started all 16 games at right tackle and gave up 3.5 sacks. The Raiders moved him to left tackle at the beginning of the 2006 preseason. In the Raiders' first game of the 2006 regular season, Gallery was part of an offensive line that gave up nine sacks (at least three of which were charged to him) to the San Diego Chargers. He played in 13 games during the season and gave up 10.5 sacks, placing him fourth in the league for most sacks given up, despite missing three games. In 2007, Oakland coaches moved Gallery to left guard.

Although Gallery had generally been considered a bust at the left tackle position for which he was drafted and had limited success at the right tackle position, he performed much better as a left guard.

Seattle Seahawks
On July 27, 2011, Gallery agreed to join the Seattle Seahawks on a three-year deal worth a reported $15 million.  He was released after one season.

New England Patriots
On March 19, 2012, Gallery signed with the New England Patriots on a one-year deal. Gallery announced his retirement from professional football on August 4, 2012.

References

External links
 Iowa Hawkeyes Bio
 Oakland Raiders Bio

1980 births
Living people
All-American college football players
American football offensive tackles
Iowa Hawkeyes football players
New England Patriots players
Oakland Raiders players
People from Buchanan County, Iowa
Players of American football from Iowa
Seattle Seahawks players
People from Manchester, Iowa
Ed Block Courage Award recipients